Norbert Misiak (born 25 June 1994) is a Polish footballer who plays as a right midfielder for Raków Częstochowa.

In July 2015 he signed three year deal with GKS Bełchatów.

References

External links
 
 
 

1994 births
Living people
Association football midfielders
Polish footballers
Ekstraklasa players
Legia Warsaw players
Footballers from Warsaw